The Mock Auctions Act 1961 was an Act of the Parliament of the United Kingdom that regulated mock auctions. It was repealed by the Consumer Protection from Unfair Trading Regulations 2008 (S.I. 2008/1277).

Background
Attempts to pass an Act regulating mock auctions started in 1928, with the Mock Auctions Bill introduced by Lord Gorell. The Bill failed after it was passed to a Select Committee, which reported that existing provisions were sufficient to deal with the problem. Opponents of the Bill argued that it would be impossible to secure convictions, since victims are reluctant to come forward and highlight their gullibility. The second Mock Auctions Bill was introduced to Parliament by a group of MPs including Norman Dodds, and received the Royal Assent on 27 July 1961.

Act
To avoid interfering with genuine auctions, the Act includes a complex and detailed definition of a mock auction. A mock auction is an auction featuring competitive bidding which satisfies one of three tests: 1) if there is a reduction in price or repayment of the money to the highest bidder, 2) if the right to bid is restricted to people who have bought other items or 3) if any items are offered as gifts or given away. The punishment for running a mock auction, if convicted, was at most either a £1,000 fine, two years in prison or both.

References

Bibliography

United Kingdom Acts of Parliament 1961
Auction case law